In mathematics, a rational zeta series is the representation of an arbitrary real number in terms of a series consisting of rational numbers and the Riemann zeta function or the Hurwitz zeta function.  Specifically, given a real number x, the rational zeta series for x is given by

where qn is a rational number, the value m is held fixed, and ζ(s, m) is the Hurwitz zeta function.  It is not hard to show that any real number x can be expanded in this way.

Elementary series
For integer m>1, one has

For m=2, a number of interesting numbers have a simple expression as rational zeta series:

and

where γ is the Euler–Mascheroni constant.  The series

follows by summing the Gauss–Kuzmin distribution. There are also series for π:

and

being notable because of its fast convergence. This last series follows from the general identity

which in turn follows from the generating function for the Bernoulli numbers

Adamchik and Srivastava give a similar series

Polygamma-related series
A number of additional relationships can be derived from the Taylor series for the polygamma function at z = 1, which is 
.
The above converges for |z| < 1.  A special case is

which holds for |t| < 2.  Here, ψ is the digamma function and ψ(m) is the polygamma function. Many series involving the binomial coefficient may be derived:

where ν is a complex number. The above follows from the series expansion for the Hurwitz zeta

taken at y = −1. Similar series may be obtained by simple algebra:

and

and

 
and

For integer n ≥ 0, the series

can be written as the finite sum

The above follows from the simple recursion relation Sn + Sn + 1 = ζ(n + 2).  Next, the series

may be written as

for integer n ≥ 1. The above follows from the identity Tn + Tn + 1 = Sn.  This process may be applied recursively to obtain finite series for general expressions of the form

for positive integers m.

Half-integer power series
Similar series may be obtained by exploring the Hurwitz zeta function at half-integer values. Thus, for example, one has

Expressions in the form of p-series
Adamchik and Srivastava give 

and

Other series
Other constants that have notable rational zeta series are:
 Khinchin's constant
 Apéry's constant

References
 
 

Zeta and L-functions
Real numbers